John Armleder (born 1948, in Geneva) is a Swiss performance artist, painter, sculptor, critic, and curator. His work is based on his involvement with Fluxus in the 1960s and 1970s, when he created performance art pieces, installations and collective art activities that were strongly influenced by John Cage. However, Armleder's position throughout his career has been to avoid associating his artistic practice with any type of manifesto.

Early life and education
Armleder was born as the son of a hotelier (owners of Le Richemond). He studied at the Ecole des Beaux-Arts, Geneva (1966-7) and at the Glamorgan Summer School, Britain (1969).

Work

In 1969, with Patrick Lucchini and Claude Rychner, Armleder founded the Groupe Ecart in Geneva, from which stemmed the Galerie Ecart and its associated performance group and publications. The Groupe Ecart was particularly important in Europe during the 1970s and 1980s, not only through its activity as an independent publishing house, but also because it introduced in Switzerland—and sometimes in Europe—a large number of notable artists, including Joseph Beuys and Andy Warhol. Armleder was later associated with the Neo-Geo artistic movement in the 1980s.

Armleder frequently examines the context in which art is displayed and views the exhibition as a medium in its own right. Since the 1990s, he has created installations, paintings, wall paintings, sculptures and what he calls Furniture Sculptures—installations that usually juxtapose furniture with monochrome or abstract paintings, either literally on the furniture or on a canvas hanging nearby. His work has varied greatly in form, and has, since the beginning, used chance as a method of producing the final forms that pieces take, much like John Cage. He often uses a dense scenographic hanging style, putting individual works into close proximity and creating installation-like exhibitions.

Exhibitions

In 1986, Armleder represented Switzerland in the Venice Biennale. In 2004, a retrospective exhibition of his works on paper was shown at the Kunsthalle Zürich, Switzerland, and later traveled to the ICA in Philadelphia. In the winter of 2006-2007, a large exhibition including works from all eras of his career was shown at the Museum of Modern and Contemporary Art (Mamco) in Geneva, Switzerland. In April 2013, Armleder had a solo show at the Dairy Art Centre in London.

Collections
Armleder's work is held in the permanent collections of numerous museums including the Musée cantonal des Beaux-Arts, Lausanne, the Staedel Museum, the Museum of Modern Art, New York, among other institutions.

Notes

External links
Documentation of recent John Armleder exhibitions
Heyoka Magazine Interview with John LeKay 
John Armleder, Venice Exhibition
John Armleder, "About Nothing" ICA Philadelphia review by Steven Stern, Frieze

1948 births
Living people
Artists from Geneva
Postmodern artists
Swiss installation artists
Conceptual artists
Swiss contemporary painters
Swiss performance artists
Swiss contemporary artists